Middlesbrough Roller Derby is a flat track roller derby league based in Middlesbrough, England. The league is a member of the Women's Flat Track Derby Association (WFTDA) and the United Kingdom Roller Derby Association.

History
In September 2007, inspired by the London Rollergirls, Natalie Boxall (derby name Germaine Leer) and Karen Slater (Bon Sleaze) founded the league under the name the Middlesbrough Milk Rollers. This made them the first roller derby league in the North East of England. 

They hosted the Northern EXPOsure roller derby exposition games on 19 September 2009, with commentary by Jet from Gladiators, which also featured Leeds Roller Dolls, Central City Roller Girls and Severn Roller Torrent. As well as taking part in bootcamps, bouts, and guest skating for other leagues, MMR also competed in the London Rollergirls' European tournament "Roll Britannia" in 2009 as part of the mixed team 'Royal Rebel Rollers'. This team was made up of skaters from Middlesbrough, Rebellion Rollergirls, and Windsor Rollergirls.

In February 2012 the team received a lottery-funded Sport England grant, making them the first roller derby league in the UK to receive one.

The Milk Rollers took first place in the Great Yorkshire Showdown tournament in July, 2012. On 22 September 2012, the league launched their B Team in a closed bout against the Norfolk Brawds, their first open bout being against the Newcastle Roller Girls Whippin' Hinnies.

Middlesbrough Roller Derby plays by the rules of the Women's Flat Track Derby Association (WFTDA) and is a member of the UK Roller Derby Association (UKRDA). In April 2013, Middlesbrough was accepted as a member of the WFTDA Apprentice Program. Middlesbrough became a full WFTDA member in July 2014.

In March 2017, the league announced a rebrand as Middlesbrough Roller Derby.

National Team Representation 
Ella Storey and Terri Sudron from the league have represented Team England at both the 2014 Roller Derby World Cup and 2018 Roller Derby World Cup.

WFTDA competition
Middlesbrough qualified for the Division 2 Playoffs and Championship in 2017 as the sixth seed in Pittsburgh, but lost 163–156 to Columbia QuadSquad and also lost their consolation round game to E-Ville Roller Derby 199–191 to finish out of the medals.

Rankings

*Please note that rankings were suspended in March 2020 in light of the COVID-19 pandemic.
 CR = consolation round

In the community
The league takes an active role in getting people in Teesside involved in roller derby and have organised and hosted fundraisers and events including running a pop-up shop as part of the 'We Are Open' project.

References

External links
Facebook
Twitter
Flickr
MMR Help Promote Show us your Art for MIMA – 15 September 2012

Roller derby in England
Roller derby leagues in the United Kingdom
Roller derby leagues established in 2007
Sport in Middlesbrough
Women's Flat Track Derby Association Division 2
2007 establishments in England